Dendrophyllia is a genus of stony cup corals in the family Dendrophylliidae. They are azooxanthellate corals, meaning that they do not contain symbiotic photosynthetic dinoflagellates as do many species of coral.

Species
The following species are listed in the World Register of Marine Species (WoRMS):

Dendrophyllia aculeata Latypov, 1990
Dendrophyllia alcocki (Wells, 1954)
Dendrophyllia alternata Pourtalès, 1880
Dendrophyllia arbuscula van der Horst, 1922
Dendrophyllia boschmai van der Horst, 1926
Dendrophyllia californica Durham, 1947
Dendrophyllia carleenae Nemenzo, 1983
Dendrophyllia cecilliana Milne Edwards & Haime, 1848
Dendrophyllia cladonia van der Horst, 1927
Dendrophyllia compressa Eguchi & Sazaki, 1973
Dendrophyllia cornigera (Lamarck, 1816)
Dendrophyllia cribrosa Milne Edwards & Haime, 1851
Dendrophyllia dilatata van der Horst, 1927
Dendrophyllia florulenta Alcock, 1902
Dendrophyllia futojiku Ogawa & Takahashi, 2000
Dendrophyllia granosa Studer, 1878
Dendrophyllia ijimai Yabe & Eguchi, 1934
Dendrophyllia incisa (Crossland, 1952)
Dendrophyllia indica Pillai, 1969
Dendrophyllia johnsoni Cairns, 1991
Dendrophyllia laboreli Zibrowius & Brito, 1984
Dendrophyllia minima Ogawa & Takahashi, 2000
Dendrophyllia minuscula Bourne, 1905
Dendrophyllia oldroydae Oldroyd, 1924
Dendrophyllia paragracilis Ogawa & Takahashi, 2000
Dendrophyllia radians (Wright, 1882)
Dendrophyllia ramea (Linnaeus, 1758)
Dendrophyllia robusta (Bourne, 1905)
Dendrophyllia suprarbuscula Ogawa & Takahashi, 2000
Dendrophyllia velata Crossland, 1952

References

Dendrophylliidae
Scleractinia genera